Scully's tube-Nosed bat (Murina tubinaris) is a species of vesper bat in the family Vespertilionidae.
It can be found in the following countries: India, Laos, Myanmar, Pakistan, Thailand, and Viet Nam.

Members of the ashy-gray tube-nosed bat species were formerly classified as Scully's bats.

References

Murininae
Bats of Asia
Mammals of India
Mammals of Pakistan
Taxonomy articles created by Polbot
Mammals described in 1881